Killara was a railway station on the Warburton line in Melbourne, Australia, which operated from the time the line opened until it closed in 1965. All that remains is the well-preserved platform retaining wall, as well as the goods platform.

External links
Killara station shortly after closing, 24 November 1964.

Disused railway stations in Melbourne
Railway stations in Australia opened in 1901
Railway stations closed in 1965